Mishroli  is a village  in Kushinagar district of Uttar Pradesh state of India.

References

Villages in Kushinagar district